Heartbreak House: A Fantasia in the Russian Manner on English Themes is a play written by George Bernard Shaw, first published in 1919 and first played at the Garrick Theatre in November 1920. According to A. C. Ward, the work argues that "cultured, leisured Europe" was drifting toward destruction, and that "Those in a position to guide Europe to safety failed to learn their proper business of political navigation". The "Russian manner" of the subtitle refers to the style of Anton Chekhov, which Shaw adapts.

Characters
Ellie Dunn
Nurse Guinness
Captain Shotover
Lady Utterword
Hesione Hushabye
Mazzini Dunn
Hector Hushabye
Boss Alfred Mangan
Randall Utterword
Burglar (Billy Dunn)

Plot summary

Ellie Dunn, her father, and her fiancé are invited to one of Hesione Hushabye’s infamous dinner parties, to be held at the house of her father, the eccentric Captain Shotover, an inventor in his late eighties who is trying to create a "psychic ray" that will destroy dynamite. The house is built in the shape of the stern of a ship. Lady Utterword, Shotover's other daughter, arrives from Australia, but he pretends not to recognise her. Hesione says they are running out of money. Shotover needs to invent a weapon of mass destruction. His last invention, a lifeboat, did not bring in much cash. Ellie intends to marry businessman Boss Mangan, but she really loves a man she met in the National Gallery. Unfortunately, her fiancé is a ruthless scoundrel, her father's a bumbling prig, and it turns out that the man she's in love with is Hector, Hesione's husband, who spends his time telling romantic lies to women. Marriage to Mangan will be the sensible choice.

A burglar is captured. They say they do not want to prosecute him, but he insists he will turn himself in unless they pay him not to. It turns out that the burglar is one of Shotover's old crewmen. He confesses that he is not a real burglar. He deliberately gets himself captured to get charitable assistance from his victims. Shotover laments that the younger generation have lost their romance. Ellie suggests that she should marry Shotover, but he says he's already married to a black Jamaican wife, though it's possible she's now dead.

Lady Utterword says that everything will be put to right if only they get some horses. Every English family should have horses. Mangan declares that he is to head a government department, but Ellie suddenly announces that she cannot marry him as she is now Shotover's "white wife". Shotover predicts that the ship of England will founder, as the captain is drunk and the crew are all gambling. The maid enters with news that an air-raid is about to happen. The lights are switched off, but Hector switches them back on to demonstrate his lack of concern about the threat. A bomb lands in the garden, blowing up Shotover's store of dynamite and killing Mangan and the burglar who were hiding there. When it is over everyone says how bored they are. They hope the bombs will come again tomorrow.

Relation to Chekhov
In the preface to the play Shaw acknowledges his debt to Chekhov, in particular to The Cherry Orchard. He writes that in comparison to himself, Chekhov was "more of a fatalist, had no faith in these charming people extricating themselves. They would, he thought, be sold up and sent adrift by the bailiffs; therefore he had no scruple in exploiting and even flattering their charm."

Critics have taken very different views about Shaw's adaptation of Chekhov. Louis Kronenberger says that Shaw "turns Chekhov into a sort of literary Hyde Park soapbox dialectic for the theatre...We should be brow-beaten indeed to accept the idea that in Heartbreak House there is more than the merest hint or tiny reflection of Chekhov's true method, none of that pure, pains-taking economy and drawing, none of that humility of vision, none of that shy certainty of intuition. And Mr. Shaw's play has none of the variety in emotional rhythm that Chekhov's has, either in tone or in profound self-revelation among the characters."

Louis Crompton, in contrast, says that,

Thomas Whitaker says that Shaw differs markedly from Chekhov by presenting his characters as mercurial "rhetorical puppets" which gives them a "surprisingly rich vitality... a heartbroken adolescent can instantly become a cynic on the prowl, a maternal confidante can also be a seductive hostess and an emasculating wife, a philandering lapdog can be a shrewd judge of character and an offstage hero, and a mad hatter can be a mad Lear and a mad Shaw."

Major themes

Society
The house could arguably be a metaphorical reference to a ship which must be guided capably, not only by its crew, but also its passengers. Each character in the house represents to some degree a facet of Edwardian British society, Mangan being the nouveau riche capitalist, Hesione the flighty Bohemian, Ellie a struggling member of the bourgeoisie and so on. Shaw divides the Edwardian upper-class into two facets: the traditional country-based gentry and aristocracy (those of Horseback Hall) and the  upper middle-class (those of Heartbreak House). The "horsey set" are identified with activity, most of it pointless; the rentiers with passivity, equally pointless. Both groups share the delusion that their worlds could continue to travel in tandem forever, which they did until Sarajevo.

Character traits
One of Shaw's most important and evident themes is reality versus appearances. By the end of the play, each character is revealed to be nothing like who they appeared to be in the beginning.
Mangan, who was reported to be "a Napoleon of industry" is revealed in the third act to be virtually penniless and incapable of running his own businesses. It is in fact Mazzini who runs Mangan's businesses although he at first appears mild and incompetent.

Fate
Mazzini's belief in fate ruling his life reinforces his feeble ability to control his situation and according to the captain dooms the ship to destruction unless competent navigation can be learned:

Captain Shotover: "Navigation. Learn it and live; or leave it and be damned." (p. 141)

Play in performance
The play was first performed in New York at the Garrick Theatre in November 1920, with Albert Perry as Shotover and Elizabeth Risdon as Ellie Dunn. It was first presented in England on 18 October 1921, at the Royal Court, with Ellen O'Malley as Ellie and Brember Wills as Shotover. Edith Evans played Lady Utterword. 
  
Heartbreak House is not often performed due to its complex structure; however it is argued that the genius of the play cannot be fully appreciated without seeing it in performance. Its subject-matter is the ignorance and indifference exhibited by the upper and upper-middle classes to the First World War and its consequences. The self-indulgence and lack of understanding of the high-class characters are central issues in British society at the time that the play illuminates.

A prominent production in America was at the Pasadena Community Playhouse in 1938, directed by Hale McKeen, with Gilmor Brown as Captain Shotover and George Reeves (then George Bessolo) as Hector Hushabye.

In 1965 the play was staged by the Edinburgh Gateway Company, directed by Victor Carin.

It was directed by John Schlesinger in a production by the National Theatre at the Old Vic in 1975 with Anna Massey, Colin Blakely, Eileen Atkins, Patience Collier and Kate Nelligan.

In 1981 it was produced at the Royal Exchange, Manchester directed by Jonathon Hales with Eleanor Bron and Lynsey Baxter

During their 1982–83 season, the Guthrie Theater had a production starring Julianne Moore

A major Broadway revival was mounted in 1984, with an all star cast headed by Sir Rex Harrison as Shotover (a role for which he was nominated for a Tony), and featuring Amy Irving, Rosemary Harris, Dana Ivey, George N. Martin and Tom Aldredge.

The play has been performed several times at the Shaw Festival in Niagara-on-the-Lake, Ontario, Canada: most notably in 1968 directed by Val Gielgud and with Jessica Tandy, Paxton Whitehead, Tony Van Bridge and Frances Hyland (this production was recorded and released by Caedmon Records [Caedmon TRS-335]); then in summer 2011 directed by Christopher Newton with Michael Ball as Captain Shotover, Blair Williams as Hector, Patrick McManus as Mazzini, Laurie Paton as Ariadne, Benedict Campbell as Mangan and Robin Evans Willis as Ellie. It also formed part of Chichester Festival Theatre's 50th Anniversary Season in 2012 and cast Derek Jacobi as Captain Shotover. The Denver Center Theatre Company staged it for a run 30 March to 29 April 2012.

It is available on VHS based on the 1985 television version directed by Anthony Page, with Rex Harrison as Shotover, Amy Irving as Ellie and Rosemary Harris as Hesione.
Also available on DVD is the 1977 BBC Play of the Month version directed by Cedric Messina, with John Gielgud as Shotover, Lesley-Anne Down as Ellie and Siân Phillips as Hesione.

The play was performed at Shaw's Corner 25–27 July 2014, produced by Michael Friend and by the Abbey Theatre, Dublin from 14 August to 13 September 2014.

In 2018, the play was staged Off-Broadway from 28 August to 29 September. The production was directed by David Staller and produced by Gingold Theatrical Group, a New York-Based Theatre Group dedicated to presenting plays that echo Shaw's values.

Aleksandr Sokurov's loose film adaptation Mournful Unconcern (Skorbnoye beschuvstviye) was made in 1987.

Editions 
Shaw, Bernard. Heartbreak House, Great Catherine, and playlets about the war. New York, Brentano's (1919)
Shaw, Bernard. Heartbreak House: A Fantasia in the Russian Manner on English Themes. With an Introduction and notes by Ward. A.C. London: Longmans Green and Co Ltd. 1961.

References

External links 
 
 
 

1919 plays
Plays by George Bernard Shaw
Plays about World War I